Elections to the consultative Regional Council (Landesrat) were held in the territory of the Saar Basin on 25 March 1928. The Centre Party remained the largest faction, winning 14 of the 30 seats. Peter Scheuer of the Centre Party was re-elected President of the Landesrat.

Results

References

Saar
Elections in Saarland
Parliamentary election